A Day in the Life is a 2010s internet television documentary web series, distributed by Hulu as its first original long-form programming venture. The first season includes six episodes starring Morgan Spurlock, whose production company, Warrior Poets, produced the show.

Production
Spurlock produced the show with his production partner, Jeremy Chilnick, through Spurlock's production company, Warrior Poets. Each episode follows a notable person around for 24 hours. The series is distributed by Hulu, which had ventured into short-form web television original content.

The show marks the beginning of what Business Wire describes as a new Hulu initiative to "support creatively and financially the work of independent storytellers". The Huffington Post describes the original programming effort as an opportunity to open the chapter that "sets Hulu on a course of semi-independence, where it can produce shows outside of its parent companies".  Previously, Hulu had been known for making repeats of existing content available, primarily from Disney, News Corp, and Comcast.

The original episodes aired on both the free Hulu service and the Hulu Plus subscription service every Wednesday for six weeks, beginning August 17, 2011. The first season featured Richard Branson, will.i.am, Russell Peters, Gregg Gillis (better known as Girl Talk), and Misty Copeland. The series premiere episode featured Branson.

Episodes

Season 1 (2011)

Season 2 (2012-13)

DVD Releases
Virgil Films and Entertainment released A Day in the Life Season 1 & 2 onto DVD with all 16 episodes of both seasons on a 2-disc set on October 8, 2013.

References

External links
 A Day in the Life at Hulu

 

2010s American documentary television series
English-language television shows
Hulu original programming
Documentary web series
American non-fiction web series
2011 American television series debuts
2013 American television series endings